Priscopedatus is an extinct genus of sea cucumbers which existed in Poland during the Triassic period. The type species is Priscopedatus pyramidalis. It also contains the species Priscopedatus normani, Priscopedatus mostleri, Priscopedatus triassicus, Priscopedatus elliptiferus.

References

Priscopedatidae
Prehistoric sea cucumber genera
Triassic echinoderms
Fossils of Poland
Fossil taxa described in 1890